The Belgium women's national under-23 volleyball team represents Belgium in international women's volleyball competitions and friendly matches under the age 23 and it is ruled and managed by the Belgium Royal Volleyball Federation That is an affiliate of International Volleyball Federation FIVB and also a part of European Volleyball Confederation CEV.

Results

FIVB U23 World Championship
 Champions   Runners up   Third place   Fourth place

Team

Current squad

The Following list include Belgium women's under-20 team that also represent the under 23 national team.

 Head coach :  Callens Fien

References

External links
Official national team website 
Official KBVBV website 

National women's under-23 volleyball teams
Volleyball in Belgium
Women's volleyball in Belgium
Volleyball